Hanley is a civil parish in the district of Malvern Hills in the county of Worcestershire, England.

Hanley William and Hanley Child are places within the parish.

Edmund Bonner (ca.1500 – 1569), Bishop of London, 1539-1549 & 1553-1559 was born in the village; an instrumental figure in the schism of Henry VIII from Rome.

References

External links 
 

Civil parishes in Worcestershire